Florin Bogdan Ștefan (born 9 May 1996) is a Romanian professional footballer who plays as a left-back for Liga I club Rapid București.

International career
Ștefan made his Romania national team debut on 8 September 2019, in a 1–0 win over Malta in the UEFA Euro 2020 qualifiers. He started the game and played the full 90 minutes.

Career statistics

Club

International

Honours
Juventus București
Liga II: 2016–17

Sepsi OSK
Cupa României runner-up: 2019–20

CFR Cluj
Liga I: 2021–22

References

External links

1996 births
Living people
Sportspeople from Slatina, Romania
Romanian footballers
Romania under-21 international footballers
Romania international footballers
Association football defenders
Liga I players
Liga II players
FC Olt Slatina players
LPS HD Clinceni players
ASC Daco-Getica București players
Sepsi OSK Sfântu Gheorghe players
CFR Cluj players
FC Rapid București players
Olympic footballers of Romania
Footballers at the 2020 Summer Olympics